In enzymology, a cucurbitacin Delta23-reductase is an enzyme that catalyzes the chemical reaction

23,24-dihydrocucurbitacin + NAD(P)+  cucurbitacin + NAD(P)H + H+

The 3 substrates of this enzyme are 23,24-dihydrocucurbitacin, NAD+, and NADP+, whereas its 4 products are cucurbitacin, NADH, NADPH, and H+.

This enzyme belongs to the family of oxidoreductases, specifically those acting on the CH-CH group of donor with NAD+ or NADP+ as acceptor.  The systematic name of this enzyme class is 23,24-dihydrocucurbitacin:NAD(P)+ Delta23-oxidoreductase. This enzyme is also called NAD(P)H: cucurbitacin B Delta23-oxidoreductase.  It employs one cofactor, manganese.

References

 
 

EC 1.3.1
NADPH-dependent enzymes
NADH-dependent enzymes
Manganese enzymes
Enzymes of unknown structure